Jules Louis Gabriel Violle (16 November 1841 – 12 September 1923) was a French physicist and inventor.

He is notable for having determined the solar constant at Mont Blanc in 1875, and, in 1881, for proposing a standard for luminous intensity, called the Violle, equal to the light emitted by 1 cm² of platinum at its melting point. It was notable as the first unit of light intensity that did not depend on the properties of a particular lamp. This was much larger than traditional measures such as candlepower, so the  standard SI unit candela was originally defined in 1946 as 1/60 Violle.

Throughout his life, Violle taught at several colleges including the University of Lyon and the Conservatoire des Arts et Métiers in Paris. He was one of the founders of the Institut d'optique théorique et appliquée and the École supérieure d'optique. He improved and invented a number of devices for measuring radiation, and determined the freezing and melting points of palladium.

Violle is believed by some to be the secret identity of Fulcanelli, a contemporary French alchemist whose true identity is still debated. His biography can be found in this book: "A l'ombre des chênes, l'alchimiste de la République".

External links
 

1841 births
1923 deaths
People from Langres
French physicists
École Normale Supérieure alumni
Members of the French Academy of Sciences
Commandeurs of the Légion d'honneur